Hanae Aoyama (青山華依, born 26 August 2002) is a Japanese athlete. She competed in the women's 4 × 100 metres relay event at the 2020 Summer Olympics.

References

External links
 

2002 births
Living people
Japanese female sprinters
Athletes (track and field) at the 2020 Summer Olympics
Olympic athletes of Japan
21st-century Japanese women